The 2012–13 Saint Mary's Gaels men's basketball team represented Saint Mary's College of California during the 2012–13 NCAA Division I men's basketball season. This was head coach Randy Bennett's twelfth season at Saint Mary's. The Gaels competed in the West Coast Conference and played their home games at the McKeon Pavilion. They finished the season 28–7, 14–2 in WCC play to finish in second place. They advanced to the championship game of the WCC tournament where they lost to Gonzaga. They received an at-large bid to the 2013 NCAA tournament where they defeated Middle Tennessee in the first four-round before falling in the second round to Memphis.

Before the season

Departures

Recruiting

Roster

Schedule and results

|-
!colspan=9 style="background:#06315B; color:#D80024;"| Regular season

|-
!colspan=9 style="background:#FFFFFF;" color#06315B;:| 2013 West Coast Conference men's basketball tournament

|-
!colspan=9|2013 NCAA tournament

References

Saint Mary's
Saint Mary's Gaels men's basketball seasons
Saint Mary's
Saint Mary's Gaels men's basketball
Saint Mary's Gaels men's basketball